Jan Thesleff (born 6 January 1959 in Lund) is a Swedish diplomat. He has served as Swedish ambassador in a number of different countries since 2006.

Career
Thesleff was born in Lund, Sweden. Between 1979 and 1985 he was educating at university in Lund, Montpellier and Tunis. For next two years he was project manager and controller of Alfa Laval in Lund then he started The Ministry of Foreign Affairs' diplomatic program. In years 1998–1991 he was Second Embassy Secretary at the Embassy in Damascus before he became Second Embassy Secretary at the Embassy in Tokyo. He became member of Embassy Council at the Embassy in Cairo. In 1999 he became member of Embassy Council at the Swedish European Union representation in Brussels with responsibility for the Middle East and North Africa issues. Next he became Political Advisor to European Union Special Envoy for Peace Middle East process. Between 2006 and 2011 he was an Ambassador to Saudi Arabia, Kuwait, Oman and Yemen then in 2011 he became an ambassador to Tunisia and Libya. In 2014 became ambassador to United Arab Emirates and in 2017 he became Ambassador to Egypt. In October 2020 Ambassador Jan Thesleff was appointed to Commissioner General – to lead the work in the Committee for Sweden´s Participation at Expo 2020 in Dubai. He took up his duties as Commissioner General in January 2021.

Personal life
He got married in 1993.

References

1959 births
Living people
Ambassadors of Sweden to Saudi Arabia
Ambassadors of Sweden to Kuwait
Ambassadors of Sweden to Oman
Ambassadors of Sweden to Yemen
Ambassadors of Sweden to Tunisia
Ambassadors of Sweden to Libya
Ambassadors of Sweden to the United Arab Emirates
Ambassadors of Sweden to Bahrain
Ambassadors of Sweden to Egypt
Ambassadors of Sweden to India
People from Lund